Kiawamururu is a settlement in Kenya's Central Province. Its in Mukurweini subcounty, Nyeri County. In the area are Kiawamururu Primary School and Njiruini Secondary School.The Village also has a coffee factory.

The residents of this area are coffee and dairy farmers. They mainly sell milk to Wakulima Dairy,  a milk processor based at Mukurweini  township.

References 

Populated places in Central Province (Kenya)